Willem "Wim" Hermsen (born September 7, 1947 in Hilversum) is an astrophysicist and a former water polo player from the Netherlands. He finished in seventh position with the Dutch Men's Water Polo Team at the 1972 Summer Olympics in Munich. Two of his brothers, André and Henk, also played water polo on the highest level, and represented the Netherlands in the Summer Olympics, in 1960 and 1964.

Hermsen obtained a PhD from Leiden University and was a professor at the University of Amsterdam from 2004 to 2012, specializing in high-energy astrophysics, and now holds an emeritus position there.

References
 Dutch Olympic Committee
 UvA album academicum

1947 births
Living people
Dutch astrophysicists
Dutch male water polo players
Olympic water polo players of the Netherlands
Water polo players at the 1972 Summer Olympics
Leiden University alumni
Academic staff of the University of Amsterdam
People from Hilversum
Sportspeople from Hilversum
20th-century Dutch people